Pavlo Kurtik (fl. 1431–1432, Albanian: Pal Kurti) was an Albanian or styled Slavo-Albanian feudal lord who held an Ottoman vilayet, an administrative unit in the Ottoman Empire similar to a county or shire, located between the Erzen and Shkumbin rivers in present-day Albania.  While he was Christian, one of a few Christian lords in the Ottoman Empire, his sons converted in Islam and held various official titles throughout the Empire.

History
In the 14th century, after the defeat of the Serbian Empire by the Ottomans, the Western Balkans became a collection of independent feudal states.  After the Battle of Savra (1385) the Ottoman Empire absorbed the area of what is now the State of Albania.  As an official in the Ottoman Empire Pavlo Kurtik is first mentioned in the first Ottoman defter (the official record of the Empire) of the Sanjak of Albania, dated 1431–1432. He entered Ottoman service shortly after 1400, and was one of few pre-Ottoman, Christian feudal lords along with his brother Karl Kurti(k). He governed over the vilayet of the same name (the Pavlo Kurtik vilayet) one of 9 vilayets of the Arvanit-ili province until 1466. In the 1431–1432 defter, Pavlo Kurtik held a timar of 26 villages subordinate to his son, Isa. The terms tahvil and vilayet-i Pavlo Kurtik shows that Pavlo Kurtik held the region before the Ottoman administration. His sons converted into Islam and became subaşi, a royal or administrative title in the Ottoman Empire similar to lord or sheriff, of various Ottoman subdivisions throughout Ottoman Albania.

Family
The Kurti family was originally Christian, but it was Islamized in the second generation.

Kurtik had the following descendants:

Annotations

Bibliography
Notes

References

 (Serbian Latin version)

15th-century Albanian people
Medieval Albanian nobility
Christians from the Ottoman Empire
Slavs from the Ottoman Empire
Albanians from the Ottoman Empire